The 2020–21 Idaho Vandals men's basketball team represented the University of Idaho in the Big Sky Conference during the 2020–21 NCAA Division I men's basketball season. Led by second-year head coach Zac Claus, the Vandals played their home games on campus at Memorial Gymnasium in Moscow, Idaho.

Due to the COVID-19 pandemic, home games were switched to venerable Memorial Gymnasium (1928). The 2020 football season in the Big Sky was delayed until early 2021; football practice started in late January in the Kibbie Dome, and the first of six games was held in late February.

This was intended to be the 46th and final season for men's basketball in the Kibbie Dome, configured as the "Cowan Spectrum" for basketball since February 2001. The university plans to open the new Idaho Central Credit Union Arena, located north of the Kibbie Dome's west end, for the 2021–22 season. They finished the season 1-21, 1-17 in Big Sky Play to finish in last place. They lost in the First Round of the Big Sky tournament to Montana.

Previous season 
The Vandals finished the 2019–20 season at 8–24 (4–16 in Big Sky, last). They were the tenth seed in the conference tourney and lost 69–75 in the opening round to seventh-seeded Southern Utah.

Roster

Schedule and results 

|-
!colspan=12 style=| Regular season

|-
!colspan=12 style=| Big Sky tournament
|-

|-

Source

References 

Idaho Vandals men's basketball seasons
Idaho Vandals
Idaho Vandals men's basketball
Idaho Vandals men's basketball